¡Hola! is a weekly Spanish-language magazine specializing in celebrity news, published in Madrid, Spain, and in 15 other countries, with local editions in Argentina, Brazil, Canada, Chile, Colombia, Greece, Indonesia, Mexico, Pakistan, Peru, Philippines, Puerto Rico, Thailand, United Kingdom, United States and Venezuela. It is the second most popular magazine in Spain after Pronto. The title means "Hello!" in English and it is the parent magazine of the English-language Hello! and Hello! Canada and Hola! USA.

History and profile
¡Hola! was founded in Barcelona on 2 September 1944 by Antonio Sánchez Gómez, who continued to run the magazine until his death in the 1970s. He employed mainly relatives and to this day ¡Hola! remains a predominantly family run organisation, with Sánchez's wife still stepping in to provide layout for important royal wedding spreads. Later the headquarters of the magazine moved to Madrid.

Initially designed as a family magazine, Sánchez soon realized the potential for profit in the women's industry and initially focused on the doings of royalty, as well as offering a self-help section. Then the magazine became a gossip magazine, although the Spanish version still relies heavily on royalty for their gossip, whilst the English and Latin American versions focus more on Hollywood. The former Spanish Prime Minister Felipe González gave his first interview to the magazine when he was in office.

The magazine continues to grow and its edition in Argentina was launched in 2010.

Circulation
The combined readership of ¡Hola! and its various sister magazines is more than a million a week, a large growth from the original 4,000 copies which sold in its first week of production in 1944. The circulation of the magazine was 654,836 copies in 1993, making it the second best-selling magazine in Spain. The magazine was the third best selling magazine in the country with a circulation of 627,514 copies in 1997.

The circulation of ¡Hola! was 553,042 copies in 2005. Its circulation was 537,270 copies in 2008 and 475,049 in 2009.

See also
 List of magazines in Spain

References

External links
 
 Official US website 

1944 establishments in Spain
Celebrity magazines
Magazines established in 1944
Magazines published in Barcelona
Magazines published in Madrid
Spanish-language magazines
Weekly magazines published in Spain